Brighton Place is an abandoned and never used subway station of the Cincinnati Subway.  The station is the last through station before the tracks go above ground along Interstate 75.  The station was planned in 1916, but lacked funding to complete. Beyond this station were three more above ground stations.  In 2002, the station was proposed to be part of the MetroMoves light rail system until the plans were rejected.

References

Former railway stations in Ohio